Markus Gisdol (born 17 August 1969) is a German football manager and former player.

Managerial career
Gisdol had coaching stints at Sonnenhof Großaspach, Ulm 1846, and 1899 Hoffenheim II. He was the assistant manager at Schalke 04.

On 2 April 2013, Gisdol replaced Marco Kurz at 1899 Hoffenheim. Gisdol's first match as a manager was a 3–0 win against Fortuna Düsseldorf and he went on to save them from relegation, leading to his full appointment as Hoffenheim's head coach. On 16 April 2015 he renewed his contract when he signed a three-year extension. 
After an unsuccessful start of Hoffenheim's 2015–16 campaign, Gisdol was sacked on 26 October 2015. On 25 September 2016, he replaced Bruno Labbadia as the head coach of Hamburger SV with a contract running until 30 June 2017. The contract was extended to 2019 on 22 March 2017. After saving Hamburg in the 2016–17 Bundesliga season from relegation, he went on a losing streak and was sacked on 21 January 2018.

On 18 November 2019, he was signed by 1. FC Köln. On 5 August 2020, Gisdol's contract was extended until July 2023. On 11 April 2021, after losing to Mainz 05, Gisdol was removed from his position as head coach.

On 10 October 2021, he was hired by Russian Premier League club FC Lokomotiv Moscow. Due to the Russian invasion of Ukraine, he resigned on 1 March 2022.

Coaching record

References

External links

Living people
1969 births
German footballers
SSV Reutlingen 05 players
1. FC Pforzheim players
SpVgg Au/Iller players
German football managers
Bundesliga managers
VfB Stuttgart II managers
SG Sonnenhof Großaspach managers
SSV Ulm 1846 managers
TSG 1899 Hoffenheim managers
Hamburger SV managers
1. FC Köln managers
Footballers from Baden-Württemberg
Association football midfielders
FC Lokomotiv Moscow managers
Russian Premier League managers
German expatriate football managers
Expatriate football managers in Russia
German expatriate sportspeople in Russia